Fingersmith is a four part BBC mini-series that was televised in 2005.

The story is an adaptation of Sarah Waters' 2002 novel of the same name and follows the meeting of two very different young women and what madness ensues. Directed by Aisling Walsh, it stars Sally Hawkins, Imelda Staunton, Elaine Cassidy, Rupert Evans and Charles Dance.

The mini-series was nominated for Best Drama Serial at the 2006 British Academy Television Awards.

Plot
Since she was orphaned, Sue Trinder (Sally Hawkins) has been brought up amongst thieves and charlatans. She has been protected and cared for by Mrs Sucksby (Imelda Staunton) and taught to become a fingersmith (a pickpocket). But when Mrs Sucksby's old friend Richard Rivers (Rupert Evans), known as Gentleman, offers 20-year-old Sue £2,000 to assist him in one of his scams, she cannot resist.

Passing himself off as a proper gent, Rivers has befriended a young lady, Maud Lilly (Elaine Cassidy), who stands to inherit a fortune when she marries. However, Maud's maid has recently left her service and, without a chaperone, Rivers' access to Maud is limited. He wants Sue to be accepted as the new maid and to help him win Maud over. Once married, Rivers plans to have Maud committed to an asylum and he will then take her fortune for himself.

Arriving at Briar, the estate where Maud lives with her wealthy bookish Uncle Lilly (Charles Dance), Sue enters another world. Maud and Sue are of a similar age and appearance but their experience of life could not be further apart. Maud's existence is one of wealth and prosperity inside a grand house, where she is her uncle's secretary and also has the duty of reading to her uncle and his friends. Over the course of a few months, Sue and Maud become friends and, briefly, lovers. Despite Sue's growing feelings for Maud, she is convinced to proceed with Rivers' scam. On Sue's advice, Maud accepts Rivers' proposal of marriage as a way of gaining her freedom from her uncle.

Once married to Maud, Rivers' next plan is to get her admitted to the asylum. But in a dramatic twist, Sue is taken to the madhouse as "Mrs Rivers" and she realises that Maud has been in on the plan from the very beginning.

Having disposed of Sue, Rivers takes Maud to London to Mrs Sucksby's house. There Maud learns that Mrs Sucksby is the mastermind behind her escape and Sue's downfall. Maud is plagued by doubts over her treatment of Sue and the fake life that she presented.

In reality, Maud was orphaned and brought up by her uncle, a cruel man, who hardened her heart. The nightly readings in his library were not as innocent as it appeared to Sue. Maud was forced to read pornography to her uncle and his friends. Tormented by the cruelty of her existence, Maud found in Rivers a way out.

By marrying him, she could escape the prison of her uncle's house. But what Maud had not expected was to be so affected by her friendship with Sue – or indeed that she would fall in love with her. In order to save herself from her uncle, Maud had to reconcile herself to hurting Sue.

But even Maud could not have imagined that her world would be further turned upside down. Mrs Sucksby reveals that through a series of twists and turns Maud and Sue were switched at birth – they have been living each other's lives. Mrs Sucksby arranged the whole scheme. Marianne Lilly, before being incarcerated in the asylum by her evil brother, changed her will, leaving one half of her wealth to her own daughter, Susan, and the other half to Maud.

Mrs Sucksby explains to Maud that she has no choice but to comply with the rest of the plan. Maud is further devastated to learn that they have no intention of rescuing Sue from the asylum.

Acknowledging the wrong she has done, Maud knows she must escape Mrs Sucksby if she is to rescue Sue. She manages to get out and finds her way to an old business associate of her uncle's, but he refuses to help and sends her away. Alone in the alleyways and streets of London and unaware of the dangers that lurk, Maud realises she has no choice but to return to Lant Street. Mrs Sucksby is overjoyed to see her and Maud discovers that she is in fact Mrs Sucksby's own daughter.

Meanwhile, employing all the underhanded tricks that her childhood has taught her, Sue escapes from the asylum. She heads for London where she plans to get her revenge on Maud for what she sees as betrayal.

At Mrs Sucksby's, Sue confronts Maud, Mrs Sucksby and Rivers; a huge row ensues and in a struggle Rivers is killed. Despite Maud being guilty of Rivers' murder, Mrs Sucksby confesses to protect both girls and soon after is executed for the crime.

Maud disappears and Sue, realising that Maud was just an innocent in Mrs Sucksby's scheme, sets off to find her. Acknowledging their feelings for one another, the two women are reunited.

Cast
 Sally Hawkins as Sue Trinder
 Elaine Cassidy as Maud Lilly
 Imelda Staunton as Mrs Sucksby
 Rupert Evans as Richard 'Gentleman' Rivers
 Charles Dance as Uncle Lilly
 David Troughton as Mr Ibbs
 Bronson Webb as John Vroom
 Stephen Wight as Charles
 Michelle Dockery as Betty
 Richard Durden as Mr Hawtrey
 Polly Hemingway as Mrs Stiles
 Sarah Badel as Mrs Frobisher
 Sarah Waters as a maid
 Ian Midlane as a warder

See also 
 The Handmaiden, a 2016 South Korean film inspired by the same novel.

References

External links

 
 
 Official BBC website
 LOGO page
 afterellen.com review of Fingersmith
 Review of the film at BBC Press Office
Interview with Elaine Cassidy at BBC Press Office
 Rotten Tomatoes page

2005 British television series debuts
2005 British television series endings
2000s British drama television series
2000s British television miniseries
English-language television shows
Television shows based on British novels
Lesbian-related television shows
Lesbian-related films
BBC television dramas
Pickpockets
2000s British LGBT-related television series
Adaptations of works by Welsh writers